Broomfleet is a village and civil parish in the East Riding of Yorkshire, England. According to the 2011 UK Census, Broomfleet parish had a population of 302, an increase on the 2001 UK Census figure of 293.

The village is served by Broomfleet railway station on the Selby Line.

The local parish church is dedicated to St Mary and is designated Grade II listed.

Whitton Island in the Humber Estuary falls partly within the parish. The island was formed from a mud and sand bank at the turn of the 21st century. Broomfleet Island is an area of low-lying land adjacent to the Humber Estuary which was historically detached from the mainland by the tidal channel of Broomfleet Hope.

References

Villages in the East Riding of Yorkshire
Civil parishes in the East Riding of Yorkshire